Ndzemdzela Langwa (born 5 March 1998), sometimes known as "Zoom" Langwa, is a Canadian soccer player who plays as a left-back for VfB Straubing in the Landesliga Bayern-Mitte.

Club career

Youth
Born in Ottawa, to parents of Cameroonian descent, he began playing soccer at age 3 with Goulbourn SC. In 2009, Langwa began playing at Ottawa South United. In 2012, he joined Toronto FC Academy, where he spent two seasons. In 2014, he returned to Ottawa South United for their U17 team in the OYSL. Late in 2014, he played for the Cataraqui Clippers in League1 Ontario, before returning to Ottawa to play for the Ottawa Fury Academy's U19 team in 2014 and their Première Ligue de soccer du Québec side in 2015. In 2015 he switched academy programs again, this time joining Vancouver Whitecaps FC Academy.

Triestina
On 28 March 2017, after months of difficulty acquiring a visa, Langwa officially signed with Italian Serie C club Triestina. He made his league debut on 24 September 2017 against Mestre.

Loan to Palmese
On 5 January 2018, Langwa was loaned to Serie D side Palmese until the end of the season.

Socuéllamos
In summer 2018, Langwa trialled with Spanish Tercera División side UD Socuéllamos during preseason. After impressing during a friendly, he signed with the club on 6 August 2018.

HFX Wanderers
On 5 February 2019 Langwa returned to Canada, signing with Canadian Premier League side HFX Wanderers. On 14 December 2019, the club announced that Langwa would not be returning for the 2020 season.

Ocean City Nor'easters
Following trials with Romanian second division side Pandurri, Spanish fourth division club Alhaurín de la Torre, and German Bundesliga club Schalke, Langwa eventually signed with Ocean City Nor'easters in the American fourth tier USL League Two, on May 7, 2021.

Strubing
In 2021, he joined VfB Straubing in the German sixth tier Landesliga Bayern-Mitte. He made his debut on September 3 against SpVgg SV Weiden.

International career
Langwa is eligible to represent Canada and Cameroon internationally.

Langwa was called up to the Canadian U17 team for the 2014 Tournoi Montaigu and made four appearances.

Personal life
Langwa grew up in Stittsville, a suburb south-west of Ottawa, Ontario and attended Sacred Heart Catholic High School. He received the nickname 'Zoom due to his pace down the left side.

Career statistics

References

External links
 
 

1998 births
Living people
Association football midfielders
Canadian soccer players
Soccer players from Ottawa
Canadian people of Cameroonian descent
Black Canadian soccer players
Canadian expatriate soccer players
Expatriate footballers in Italy
Canadian expatriate sportspeople in Italy
Expatriate footballers in Spain
Canadian expatriate sportspeople in Spain
Toronto FC players
Ottawa Fury FC players
Vancouver Whitecaps FC players
U.S. Triestina Calcio 1918 players
HFX Wanderers FC players
League1 Ontario players
Serie C players
Serie D players
Tercera División players
Canadian Premier League players
Canada men's youth international soccer players
Kingston Clippers players